Belle Creek is a trout stream in Goodhue County, in the U.S. state of Minnesota. It is a tributary of the Cannon River.

Belle is a name derived from French meaning "beautiful".

See also
List of rivers of Minnesota

References

Rivers of Goodhue County, Minnesota
Rivers of Minnesota
Southern Minnesota trout streams